Romanization of Persian or Latinization of Persian is the representation of the Persian language (Iranian Persian, Dari and Tajik) with the Latin script. Several different romanization schemes exist, each with its own set of rules driven by its own set of ideological goals.

Romanization is familiar to many Persian speakers.
Many use an ad hoc romanization for text messaging and email;
road signs in Iran commonly include both Persian and English (in order to make them accessible to foreigners);
and websites use romanized domain names.

Romanization paradigms
Because the Perso-Arabic script is an abjad writing system (with a consonant-heavy inventory of letters), many distinct words in standard Persian can have identical spellings, with widely varying pronunciations that differ in their (unwritten) vowel sounds. Thus a romanization paradigm can follow either transliteration (which mirrors spelling and orthography) or transcription (which mirrors pronunciation and phonology).

Transliteration
Transliteration (in the strict sense) attempts to be a complete representation of the original writing, so that an informed reader should be able to reconstruct the original spelling of unknown transliterated words. Transliterations of Persian are used to represent individual Persian words or short quotations, in scholarly texts in English or other languages that do not use the Arabic alphabet.

A transliteration will still have separate representations for different consonants of the Persian alphabet that are pronounced identically in Persian. Therefore, transliterations of Persian are often based on transliterations of Arabic. The representation of the vowels of the Perso-Arabic alphabet is also complex, and transliterations are based on the written form.

Transliterations commonly used in the English-speaking world include BGN/PCGN romanization and ALA-LC Romanization.

Non-academic English-language quotation of Persian words usually uses a simplification of one of the strict transliteration schemes (typically omitting diacritical marks) and/or unsystematic choices of spellings meant to guide English speakers using English spelling rules towards an approximation of the Persian sounds.

Transcription
Transcriptions of Persian attempt to straightforwardly represent Persian phonology in the Latin script, without requiring a close or reversible correspondence with the Perso-Arabic script, and also without requiring a close correspondence to English phonetic values of Roman letters.

Main romanization schemes
 DMG (1969), a strict scientific system by the German Oriental Society (Deutsche Morgenländische Gesellschaft). It corresponds to Deutsches Institut für Normung standard DIN 31635.
 ALA-LC (1997), the ALA-LC romanization.
 BGN/PCGN (1958), the BGN/PCGN romanization.
 EI (1960), the system used in early editions of Encyclopædia Iranica.
 EI (2012), its contemporary modification.
 UN (1967), the  Iranian national system (1966), that was approved by the UNGEGN in 1967.
 UN (2012), its contemporary modification.

Comparison table 

Notes:

Pre-Islamic period 
In the pre-Islamic period Old and Middle Persian employed various scripts including Old Persian cuneiform, Pahlavi and Avestan scripts. For each period there are established transcriptions and transliterations by prominent linguists.

Notes:

A sample romanization (a poem by Hafez):

Other romanization schemes

Baháʼí Persian romanization

Baháʼís use a system standardized by Shoghi Effendi, which he initiated in a general letter on March 12, 1923. The Baháʼí transliteration scheme was based on a standard adopted by the Tenth International Congress of Orientalists which took place in Geneva in September 1894. Shoghi Effendi changed some details of the Congress's system, most notably in the use of digraphs in certain cases (e.g. s͟h instead of š), and in incorporating the solar letters when writing the definite article al- (Arabic: ال) according to pronunciation (e.g. ar-Rahim, as-Saddiq, instead of al-Rahim, al-Saddiq).

A detailed introduction to the Baháʼí Persian romanization can usually be found at the back of a Baháʼí scripture.

ASCII Internet romanizations

It is common to write Persian language with only the Latin alphabet (as opposed to the Persian alphabet) especially in online chat, social networks, emails and SMS. It has developed and spread due to a former lack of software supporting the Persian alphabet, and/or due to a lack of knowledge about the software that was available. Although Persian writing is supported in recent operating systems, there are still many cases where the Persian alphabet is unavailable and there is a need for an alternative way to write Persian with the basic Latin alphabet. This way of writing is sometimes called Fingilish or Pingilish (a portmanteau of Farsi or Persian and English). In most cases this is an ad hoc simplification of the scientific systems listed above (such as ALA-LC or BGN/PCGN), but ignoring any special letters or diacritical signs. ع may be written using the numeral "3", as in the Arabic chat alphabet (though this is rarely done). The details of the spelling also depend on the contact language of the speaker; for example, the vowel  is often spelt "oo" after English, but Persian speakers from Germany and some other European countries are more likely to use "u".

Tajik Latin alphabet

The Tajik language or Tajik Persian is a variety of the Persian language. It was written in the Tajik SSR in a standardized Latin script from 1926 until the late 1930s, when the script was officially changed to Cyrillic. However, Tajik phonology differs slightly from that of Persian in Iran. As a result of these two factors romanization schemes of the Tajik Cyrillic script follow rather different principles. However, Google Translate still uses this alphabet .

Variation proposed by Mir Shamsuddin Adib-Soltani
A variation (that is sometimes called "Pârstin") proposed by linguist Mir Shamsuddin Adib-Soltani in 1976 has seen some use by other linguists, such as David Neil MacKenzie for the transliteration of the Perso-Arabic scripture.

The letters of this variation of the Latin alphabet are the basic Latin letters: Aa, Bb, Cc, Dd, Ee, Ff, Gg, Hh, Ii, Jj, Kk, Ll, Mm, Nn, Oo, Pp, Qq, Rr, Ss, Tt, Uu, Vv, Xx, Yy, Zz, plus the additional letters to support the native sounds: Ââ, Čč, Šš, Žž (the latter three from Slavic alphabets, like the Czech one).

Besides being one of the simplest variations proposed for the Latinization of the Persian alphabet, this variation is based on the Alphabetic principle. Based on this principle, each individual speech sound is represented by a single letter and there is a one-to-one correspondence between sounds and the letters that represent them. This principle, besides increasing the clarity of the text and preventing confusion for the reader, is specifically useful for representing the native sounds of the Persian language, for which there are no equivalents in most other languages written in a Latin-based alphabet. For instance, compound letters used in the other variations, such as kh and gh, in addition to sh and zh are respectively represented by x, q, š and ž.

Variation proposed by Michael Füstumum
This is featured to be phonemic and etymological. It is based on Dâri because its phonology is the most conservative:

See also

Persian alphabet
Persian phonology
Romanization of Arabic
Romanization of Syriac

References

External links
 Comparison of DMG, UN, ALA-LC, BGN/PCGN, EI, ISO 233-3 transliterations
 Transliteration of Non-Roman Scripts
 Iranian Committee on the Standardization of Geographical Names (ICSGN)

Persian orthography
Romanization of Arabic
Persian scripts